Martin Rauschenberg Brorsen (born 15 January 1992) is a Danish professional footballer who plays for Stjarnan as a defender.

References

External links
 

1992 births
Living people
Danish men's footballers
Danish expatriate men's footballers
Esbjerg fB players
Danish Superliga players
Úrvalsdeild karla (football) players
Gefle IF players
IF Brommapojkarna players
Allsvenskan players
Superettan players
Stjarnan players
Expatriate footballers in Sweden
Association football defenders
People from Ribe
Sportspeople from the Region of Southern Denmark